Alfred Harris Insinger, Jr. (1 July 1909 Blue Bell, Pennsylvania – 8 September 1935 Oakland, California) was an American racecar driver. He was killed in a racing accident.

Biography
He was born on July 1, 1909 in Blue Bell, Pennsylvania  to Alfred Harris Insinger, Sr. (1877-1918) and Catherine L. Meehan. He was killed in a racing accident on September 8, 1935 at Oakland Speedway in Oakland, California.

Indy 500 results

References

External links

1909 births
1935 deaths
Indianapolis 500 drivers
People from Whitpain Township, Pennsylvania
Racing drivers from Pennsylvania
Racing drivers who died while racing
Sports deaths in California